Faure Chomón Mediavilla (15 January 1929 – 5 December 2019) was a Cuban historian and politician. He was one of the founding members and leaders of the Directorio Revolucionario Estudiantil. After the triumph of the Revolution he joined Fidel Castro's government. Early in his career, he served as the Secretary of Communication and Transportation and Ambassador to the Soviet Union. Later he served as Ambassador to Vietnam and Ecuador as well as historian of the Revolution. He was also member of the National Assembly of People's Power from 1976 to his death.

He was born in Manatí, 45 km north of the city of Las Tunas.

He began as a student leader in the Federation of University Students (FEU).  As members of the Revolutionary Directorate, on 13 March 1957, during the dictatorship of Fulgencio Batista, he led, together with Carlos Gutiérrez Menoyo, the revolutionary group made up of 50 men that carried out the assault on the Presidential Palace, where he was seriously injured. He was part of the Las Villas Front under the command of Ernesto Guevara.

Once the revolution triumphed Faure was recognized in the rank of commander of the armed forces.

He died on 5 December 2019 in Havana (Cuba), due to multiple organ dysfunction syndrome.

See also

Directorio Revolucionario Estudiantil
Havana Presidential Palace attack (1957)
Humboldt 7 massacre
Radiocentro CMQ Building
Presidential Palace
José Antonio Echeverría
Eloy Gutiérrez Menoyo
Rolando Cubela Secades

References

External links
El Ataque al Palacio Presidencial 13 de Marzo de 1957

1929 births
2019 deaths
Communist Party of Cuba politicians
Members of the National Assembly of People's Power
20th-century Cuban politicians
21st-century Cuban politicians
Ambassadors of Cuba to Vietnam
Ambassadors of Cuba to the Soviet Union